The following is a list of notable events and releases of the year 1891 in Norwegian music.

Events

Deaths

Births

 February
 27 – Issay Dobrowen, pianist, composer and orchestra conductor (died 1953).

 April
 19 – Henrik Adam Due, violinist (died 1966).

 June
 5 – Gunnar Gjerstrøm, pianist and composer (died 1951).

See also
 1891 in Norway
 Music of Norway

References

 
Norwegian music
Norwegian
Music
1890s in Norwegian music